Dimitris Bertsimas is an American applied mathematician, and a professor in the Sloan School of Management at the Massachusetts Institute of Technology (MIT), Cambridge, Massachusetts.

In 2005, Bertsimas was elected a member of the National Academy of Engineering for contributions to optimization theory and stochastic systems and innovative applications in financial engineering and transportation.

Biography 

Bertsimas received a Diploma in Electrical Engineering from the National Technical University of Athens, Greece, in 1985 and an MS and PhD in Operations Research at the Massachusetts Institute of Technology in 1987 and 1988 respectively. Since 1988, he has been with the MIT faculty. His research interests include optimization, machine learning and applied probability and their applications in health care, finance, operations management and transportation. He has co-authored more than 250 scientific papers and five graduate level textbooks. He is the editor in Chief of INFORMS Journal on Optimization and former department editor in Optimization for Management Science and in Financial Engineering in Operations Research. He is the founding director of the Masters of Business Analytics at MIT. He is currently the Associate Dean of Business Analytics at MIT's Sloan School Management. He has supervised 81 doctoral students and he is currently supervising 25 others. He has been a serial entrepreneur in the areas of financial services, health care, education, machine learning and transportation.

Awards and honors 
 INFORMS Fellow.
 INFORMS Frederic W. Lanchester prize
 INFORMS von Neumann Theory Prize
 INFORMS President Award
 INFORMS Farkas Prize
 INFORMS Erlang Prize
 SIAM Optimization Prize.
 Member of National Academy of Engineering.

Textbooks

 The Analytics Edge, 2016.
 Introduction to Linear Optimization, 2008.
 Data, Models, and Decisions, 2004.
 Optimization Over Integers, 2005.
 Machine Learning Under a Modern Optimization Lens, 2019.

See also
 Optimization (mathematics)

References 

MIT School of Engineering alumni
MIT Sloan School of Management faculty
Living people
Greek emigrants to the United States
Members of the United States National Academy of Engineering
Fellows of the Institute for Operations Research and the Management Sciences
National Technical University of Athens alumni
Year of birth missing (living people)
People from Athens